is a Japanese actor and voice actor from Tokyo. He is currently affiliated with Engeki Shūdan Yen. He graduated from the Osaka University of Arts.

Filmography

Television dramas
Tokugawa Yoshinobu (1998) (Prince Arisugawa Taruhito)
Called a fake doctor ~ Okinawa · Last medical intervention ~ (2010)

Television animation
Turn A Gundam (1999) (Joseph Yaht)
Boogiepop Phantom (2000) (Delinquent C)
Midnight Horror School (2003) (Makunero)
Yakitate!! Japan (2004) (Kageto Kinoshita)
Zipang (2004) (Sergeant)
Kekkaishi (2006) (Sekia)
Dinosaur King (2008) (Zapper)
Kon'nichiwa Anne: Before Green Gables (2009) (Bert Thomas)
Naruto: Shippuden (2010) (Kandachi)
The Tatami Galaxy (2010) (Aijima)
Cardfight!! Vanguard (2011) (Gai Usui)
Mysterious Joker (2011) (No. 99)
Naruto: Shippuden (2012) (Karai)
Beast Saga (2013) (Foxcon)
Star Blazers: Space Battleship Yamato 2199 (2013) (Gol Heinig)
Cardfight!! Vanguard G (2015) (Gai Usui)
Durarara!!×2 (2015) (Kine)
Triage X (2015) (D)
91 Days (2016) (Cerotto)
Lupin the 3rd Part IV: The Italian Adventure (2016) (Kōsuke Holmes Akechi)
Duel Masters (2017) (Decky)
Altair: A Record of Battles (2017) (Daniel Bieger)
Devilman Crybaby (2018) (Glasses Mob)
Fist of the Blue Sky Re:Genesis (2018) (Yasaka)
Junji Ito Collection (2018) (Ogi)
Zombie Land Saga (2018) (Death Uncle B)
Dororo (2019) (Itachi)
Auto Boy - Carl from Mobile Land (2020) (DJ Navi)
Yurei Deco (2022) (Hank)
Tatami Time Machine Blues (2022) (Aijima)

OVA
Kite Liberator (1998) (Kōichi Doi)
Demon Prince Enma (2006) (Kapaeru)

Theatrical animation
Turn A Gundam I: Earth Light (2002) (Joseph Yaht)
Turn A Gundam II: Moonlight Butterfly (2002) (Joseph Yaht)
Cyborg 009: Call of Justice (2016) (Cyborg 007 / Great Britain)
Mobile Suit Gundam Narrative (2018) (Amaya)

Video games
Super Robot Wars Alpha Gaiden (2001) (Joseph Yaht)
Crash Nitro Kart (2003) (N. Trance)
Crash Twinsanity (2004) (Moritz of the Evil Twins)
Resident Evil 7: Biohazard (2017) (Lucas Baker)
Overwatch 2 (2022) (Ramattra)

Tokusatsu
Shuriken Sentai Ninninger (2015) (Yokai Amikiri)

Dubbing roles

Live-action
T.J. Miller
Unstoppable (Gilleece)
Search Party (Jason)
Transformers: Age of Extinction (Lucas Flannery)
Deadpool (Weasel)
Ready Player One (i-R0k)
Deadpool 2 (Weasel)
Underwater (Paul Abel)
Action Point (Ziffel (Johnny Pemberton))
Alita: Battle Angel (Romo (Derek Mears))
An Education (Danny (Dominic Cooper))
Arthur (Arthur Bach (Russell Brand))
The Assassination of Jesse James by the Coward Robert Ford (Robert Ford (Casey Affleck))
Back to the Future (2014 BS Japan edition) (Dave McFly (Marc McClure))
Batman v Superman: Dawn of Justice (Vikram Gandhi)
Battleship (Jimmy Ord (Jesse Plemons))
Bedtime Stories (Mickey (Russell Brand))
Burlesque (Jack Miller (Cam Gigandet))
Celeste and Jesse Forever (Jesse Abrams (Andy Samberg))
Crash & Bernstein (Crash (Tim Lagasse))
Cry Macho (Aurelio (Horacio Garcia Rojas))
Doctor Who (Mickey Smith (Noel Clarke))
Fast Five (Diogo (Luis Da Silva Jr.))
Final Cut (Fatih (Jean-Pascal Zadi))
Final Destination 5 (Nathan Sears (Arlen Escarpeta))
Get Out (Jeremy Armitage (Caleb Landry Jones))
Godzilla (Akio's Father (Warren Takeuchi))
The Good, the Bad, the Weird (Man-gil (Ryu Seung-soo))
The Grand Budapest Hotel (Zero Moustafa (Tony Revolori))
Harry Potter and the Deathly Hallows – Part 1 (Scabior (Nick Moran))
His Dark Materials (Lee Scoresby (Lin-Manuel Miranda))
iZombie (Clive Babineaux (Malcolm Goodwin))
Jack the Giant Slayer (General Fallon's Small Head (John Kassir))
Kenan & Kel (Kel (Kel Mitchell))
Land of the Lost (Cha-Ka (Jorma Taccone))
Lincoln Rhyme: Hunt for the Bone Collector (Felix (Tate Ellington))
Lions for Lambs
Mad Max: Fury Road (2019 THE CINEMA edition) (Slit (Josh Helman))
Magic Mike XXL (Tito (Adam Rodríguez))
The Man with the Iron Fists (Silver Lion (Byron Mann))
Miss March (Tucker Cleigh (Trevor Moore))
Mister Lonely (Michael Jackson (Diego Luna))
The Pacific (Pfc. Wilbur "Runner" Conley (Keith Nobbs))
Popstar: Never Stop Never Stopping (Conner Friel (Andy Samberg))
Preacher (Proinsias Cassidy (Joe Gilgun))
Racing Stripes (2006 NTV edition) (Scuzz (David Spade))
Restless (Hiroshi (Ryo Kase))
The Ridiculous 6 (Pete "Lil Pete" Stockburn (Taylor Lautner))
Rogue (Simon (Stephen Curry))
Scary Movie (Shorty Meeks (Marlon Wayans))
The Smurfs (Jokey Smurf (Paul Reubens))
The Smurfs 2 (Jokey Smurf (Paul Reubens))
Squid Game (Ali Abdul (Anupam Tripathi))
Suicide Squad (Chato Santana / El Diablo (Jay Hernandez))
The Suicide Squad (Calendar Man (Sean Gunn))
Texas Chainsaw Massacre (Dante Spivey (Jacob Latimore))
Three Billboards Outside Ebbing, Missouri (Red Welby (Caleb Landry Jones))
Transformers: Dark of the Moon (Igor (Greg Berg))
Transformers: The Last Knight (Mohawk (Reno Wilson))
True Detective (Roland West (Stephen Dorff))
Unfriended (Adam (Will Peltz))
Unleashed (Lefty (Dylan Brown))
The Watch (Jamarcus (Richard Ayoade))
Whiteout (Russell Haden (Alex O'Loughlin))

Animation
Cloudy with a Chance of Meatballs 2 (Chicken Brent)
The Croods (Thunk)
The Croods: A New Age (Thunk)
Home Movies (Jason Penopolis)
Open Season 3 (Alistair)
Ozzy (Ozzy)
The Queen's Corgi (Jack)
Rango (Elbows)
Sausage Party (The Druggie)
Smallfoot (Fleem)
Storks (Dougland)
Surf's Up 2: WaveMania (Chicken Joe)
Turbo (Tito Lopez)
Monster Hunter: Legends of the Guild (Nox)

References

External links
 
 

1974 births
Living people
Japanese male stage actors
Japanese male video game actors
Japanese male voice actors
Male voice actors from Tokyo
Osaka University of Arts alumni